Border Wolves is a 1938 American Western film directed by Joseph H. Lewis and written by Norton S. Parker. The film stars Bob Baker, Constance Moore, Fuzzy Knight, Dick Jones, Willie Fung, Oscar O'Shea and Frank Campeau. The film was released on February 25, 1938, by Universal Pictures.

Plot
Rusty Reynolds and his partner Clem Barrett are heading to California, but then come upon a wagon train massacre and arrested by mistake. They are sentenced to hang, but on the night before the execution, they are released by the Judge that gave them their sentence since he knows they are innocent and that the real culprit is his son.

Cast       
Bob Baker as Rusty Reynolds
Constance Moore as Mary Jo Benton
Fuzzy Knight as Clem Barrett
Dick Jones as Jimmie Benton
Willie Fung as Ling Wong
Oscar O'Shea as Judge Coleman
Frank Campeau as Tom Dawson
Glenn Strange as Deputy Joe O'Connell
Ed Cassidy as Valley Falls Sheriff Haight
Jack Montgomery as MacKay
Dick Dorrell as Jack Carson aka Jack Coleman

References

External links
 

1938 films
1930s English-language films
American Western (genre) films
1938 Western (genre) films
Universal Pictures films
Films directed by Joseph H. Lewis
American black-and-white films
1930s American films